Radio Roo is a British children's television programme which featured the adventures of Dennis and Clive, who run a radio station, Radio Roo, based in England that Clive inherited. The show ran for a total of 31 episodes from 25 February 1991 to 29 March 1993 on the BBC. All episodes were written by Wayne Jackman, who starred as Dennis. The broad Australian accent of Clive the Kangaroo was provided by Ian Tregonning.

References

External links

1991 British television series debuts
1993 British television series endings
BBC children's television shows
Television series about kangaroos and wallabies
Fictional radio stations
British television shows featuring puppetry
English-language television shows